Ice hockey is a team sport played on ice.

Ice hockey may also refer to:

 Ice Hockey (Atari 2600), a video game for the Atari 2600
 Ice Hockey (1988 video game), a video game by Nintendo
 Hockey on the ice, an old name for the team sport bandy